Maruthur is a village in the Palayamkottai Block,  Palayam kottai taluk Tirunelveli district of Tamil Nadu, in India. It belongs to both the Nanguneri assembly constituency and the Tirunelveli parliamentary constituency. The village is surrounded by wetlands and paddy fields. The main occupation of the population is agriculture. In the summer, pulses are grown as a relay crop.  There are three tanks to irrigate the paddy crop, and the Palayam channel of Thamirabharani irrigation system acts as a feeding channel for the tanks. Thamirabharani river flows on the eastern side of the village.

References

Villages in Tirunelveli district